Clifford Kenyon CBE (11 August 1896 – 29 April 1979) was a British farmer and politician.

Kenyon was educated at Brighton Grove College in Manchester, and the University of Manchester. He worked on his father's farm, Scarr Barn Farm at Crawshawbooth near Rossendale, which he eventually inherited.

In 1922 Kenyon joined the Labour Party and the next year was elected to Rawtenstall Council, of which he became Mayor from 1938 to 1942. He was appointed a Justice of the Peace for Lancashire in 1941. At the 1945 general election, Kenyon was elected as Labour Member of Parliament for Chorley.

Kenyon was a rare farmer on the Labour benches and often took up agricultural issues. He opposed agricultural subsidies and British membership of the European Economic Community. In 1950 he almost lost his seat to Andrew Fountaine, even though Fountaine's nomination by the Conservatives had officially been withdrawn. He remained a backbencher, and in the 1966 Parliament he was chairman of the Committee of Selection which chose members for other committees. The Liberal Party criticised him for picking only one Liberal MP to sit on the Standing Committee examining the 1968 Finance Bill.

At the 1970 general election, Kenyon retired; his seat went to the Conservative candidate Constance Monks.

References
M. Stenton and S. Lees, "Who's Who of British MPs" (Harvester Press, 1981)

External links 
 

1896 births
1979 deaths
Councillors in Lancashire
Labour Party (UK) MPs for English constituencies
UK MPs 1945–1950
UK MPs 1950–1951
UK MPs 1951–1955
UK MPs 1955–1959
UK MPs 1959–1964
UK MPs 1964–1966
UK MPs 1966–1970